Guest is an unincorporated community in DeKalb County, Alabama, United States.

History
The community was most likely named for the local Guest family. A post office called Guest was established in 1892, and remained in operation until it was discontinued in 1905.

References

Unincorporated communities in DeKalb County, Alabama
Unincorporated communities in Alabama